The 2002 PGA Tour of Australasia was a series of men's professional golf events played in Australia and New Zealand.

In 2002, the PGA Tour of Australasia reverted to a calendar based schedule from a seasonal one. As such, tournaments ran from November 2001 through to December 2002, with two editions of both the Australian PGA Championship and the Australian Open. In addition, many of the tournaments from the Development Tour were re-incorporated into the main tour schedule in 2002. Three events were co-sanctioned by the European Tour, with the Johnnie Walker Classic also being sanctioned by the Asian Tour, and two were co-sanctioned by the Nationwide Tour.

Craig Parry was the tour's leading money winner for the second time, finishing almost A$150,000 ahead of Peter Lonard. He had previously topped the money list in 1995.

Schedule
The following table lists official events during the 2002 season.

Order of Merit
The Order of Merit was based on prize money won during the season, calculated in Australian dollars.

Notes

References

External links

PGA Tour of Australasia
Australasia
PGA Tour of Australasia
PGA Tour of Australasia